Le Paria is a French action film from 1969. The film was also known under the title Diamond Rush (UK),  (Spain),  (Italy).

Plot 
Manu faces off against a band of gangsters. The villains find refuge in the house of a widow with a young son. Manu sacrifices himself for Lucia and her son.

Cast 
 Jean Marais as Manu
 Marie-José Nat as Lucia
 Horst Frank as Rolf
 Nieves Navarro as Sylvia
 Enrique San Francisco as José (as Quique San Francisco)
 J. Picas as Toccelli
 J. Rocha as Turchi
 Josep Castillo Escalona as Max (as C. Escalona)
 A. Gadea as Paul
 Jean Lara
 Jacques Stany
 Béatrice Delf
 Eric Donat

Reception 
It had admissions of 777 887.

References

External links 
 
 Le Paria at Gaumont 
 Le Paria at Uni France
 Le Paria (1969), Jaque mate at Films de France

1969 films
1969 drama films
Andorran comedy films
Andorran detective films
1960s French-language films
French comedy films
French detective films
Spanish comedy films
Spanish detective films
1960s French films